Meredith Bergmann is an American sculptor, poet, and essayist whose work is said to "forge enriching links between the past and the concerns of the present." She studied at Wesleyan University and graduated from The Cooper Union with a BFA. While at Cooper Union she discovered sculpture and spent several years traveling around Europe and studying in Pietrasanta, Italy. Her memorial to Countee Cullen is in the collection of the New York Public Library.   In 2003, she unveiled the Boston Women's Memorial on Commonwealth Avenue Mall in Boston which includes statues of Phillis Wheatley, Abigail Adams, and Lucy Stone.  In 2006, Bergmann's statue of the famous contralto Marian Anderson was unveiled on the campus of Converse College in Spartanburg, South Carolina. In 2010, Bergmann created a sculpture of a slave girl named Sally Maria Diggs, or "Pinky," whose freedom was purchased for $900 in 1860. Bergmann also completed a commission commemorating the events of September 11, 2001 for New York City's Cathedral of St. John the Divine entitled Memorial to September 11.

Women's Rights Pioneers Monument 
On August 26, 2020, the 100th anniversary of the ratification of the Nineteenth Amendment to the United States Constitution granting women the right to vote, her Women's Rights Pioneers Monument was dedicated in Central Park, New York City. Commissioned by Monumental Women, it portrays and honors suffragists Sojourner Truth, Susan B. Anthony, and Elizabeth Cady Stanton. It is Central Park's first statue depicting historical, and not fictional, female figures. The foundry responsible in delivering the work is UAP (formerly named Polich Tallix.)

Selected exhibitions
2018    Breaking the Bronze Ceiling, NY State Museum, Albany NY
2017    National Sculpture Society 84thAnnual, Brookgreen Gardens, SC
2016    The Christa Project, Cathedral of St. John the Divine, NY
2011    Migrations, Proteus Gowanus, Brooklyn, NY September 11, Cathedral of St. John the Divine, NY
2010    Artist and Artifact, Brooklyn Historical Society, NY The Great Nude Invitational, NYC
1996    Biography Memorials, Woodlawn Cemetery, Bronx NY
1993    Surprise!, Elaine Benson Gallery, Bridgehampton, NY
1992    Growing Up, West Side YMCA, NYC

Awards
2019    Augustus St. Gaudens Artistic Achievement Award, The Cooper Union
2017    Proskauer Prize, National Sculpture Society
2008    Brooklyn Historical Society Residency
2003    Grand Circle Foundation for Boston Women's Memorial
2002    Edward Ingersoll Browne Fund for Boston Women's Memorial
2001    Barbara Lee Family Foundation for Boston Women's Memorial
1997    Fellowship for Sculpture, New York Foundation for the Arts
1983    Fellowship for Sculpture, New Jersey State Council On the Arts
1982    Project Grant, New York State Council On the Arts
1977    The Eliot Lash Award for Sculpture, The Cooper Union

References

Living people
Year of birth missing (living people)
21st-century American sculptors
Cooper Union alumni
Wesleyan University alumni
American women poets
American women sculptors
21st-century American women artists
21st-century American poets
21st-century American women writers